Munthe is a surname, mainly used in Scandinavia. Notable people with the surname include:

Adolph Frederik Munthe (1817–1884), Norwegian military officer and government officia
Anna Munthe-Norstedt (1854–1936), Swedish painter
Audun Munthe-Kaas Hierman (1892–1975), Norwegian newspaper editor and novelist
Axel Munthe (1857–1949), Swedish-born physician and psychiatrist
Carl Oscar Munthe (1861–1952), Norwegian military officer and historian
Christopher Morgenstierne Munthe (1875–1939), Norwegian genealogist
Gerhard Munthe (1849–1929), Norwegian painter and illustrator
Gustaf Munthe (1896–1962), Swedish writer, art historian and art teacher
Hans Munthe-Kaas (born 1961), Norwegian mathematician at the University of Bergen
Hartvig Andreas Munthe (1845–1905), Norwegian military officer, engineer and genealogist.
Henrik Munthe (1860–1958), Swedish geologist
Herman Munthe-Kaas (1890–1977), Norwegian architect
Holm Hansen Munthe (1848–1898), Norwegian architect
Hugo Munthe-Kaas (1922–2012), Norwegian intelligence agent and resistance fighter during World War II
Johan Munthe Cappelen (1884–1962), Norwegian legal scholar and judge
Johan Wilhelm Normann Munthe (1864–1935) was born in Bergen, Norway. After a military education in the cavalry, he emigrated to China
Lagertha Munthe (1888–1984), Norwegian painter
Ludvig Munthe (1841–1896), Norwegian-born, German landscape painter
Malcolm Munthe (1910–1995), British soldier, writer and curator
Margrethe Munthe (1860–1931), Norwegian teacher, children's writer, songwriter and playwright
Otto Hjersing Munthe-Kaas (1883–1981), Norwegian politician, businessman and military officer
Preben Munthe (1922–2013), Norwegian economist
Wilhelm Munthe (1883–1965), Norwegian librarian

See also 
Munthe af Morgenstierne (noble family), Danish and a Norwegian noble family living in Norway

References